Diaprochaeta is a genus of bristle flies in the family Tachinidae.

Species
Diaprochaeta illustris Mesnil, 1970

Distribution
Zimbabwe.

References

Exoristinae
Tachinidae genera
Diptera of Africa
Monotypic Brachycera genera